MMV may refer to:
 2005, in Roman numerals

People
 Melissa Mark-Viverito (born 1969), American politician

Places
 McMinnville Municipal Airport, McMinnville, Oregon, United States (FAA location identifier: MMV)

Companies and organizations
 Marvelous Interactive, a Japanese developer and publisher of video games
 Medicines for Malaria Venture, a not-for-profit public-private partnership

Entertainment and media
 Stormblåst MMV, a 2005 re-recording of Stormblåst by the Norwegian Black metal band, Dimmu Borgir
 MMV, a compilation album by Black metal band Venom

Other uses
 Maryland Medal for Valor
 Maximum majority voting, a voting method that selects a single winner using votes that express preferences
 Medal of Military Valour, a Canadian decoration which grants recipients the ability to use the post-nominal letters MMV
 Maize mosaic virus